Green papaya salad (and ) is a spicy salad made from shredded unripe papaya. It was created by the Lao people and is a popular national dish of Laos. It also has become popular in Thailand  and rest of the continental Southeast Asia (Cambodia, Myanmar, and Vietnam), as well as Xishuangbanna (China).

History

Papaya and chili peppers were introduced to Southeast Asia by the Spanish and Portuguese explorers in the 17th century from the Americas. Simon de la Loubère (1642-1729), a French diplomat, mentioned in his book that the cultivation of papaya was already widespread in Siam in 1693.
Although it is unknown when papayas entered Laos specifically, they had already been integrated into Lao culture by the time of Jean-Baptiste Pallegoix's visit in 1836. Papaya, among other fruits, were cultivated in Cambodia by Chinese settlers who immigrated in the 1500s from Hainan, China. The Lao name for papaya is mak hung and was likely derived from l'hun or lohung/rohung as papayas are called by Cambodians and Cambodian indigenous people living in provinces bordering the Southeastern region of Laos. It is believed that green papaya salad, known as tam mak hung or tam som in Lao and as som tam in Thai, likely originated in Laos. 

Thai historian Sujit Wongthes has speculated that the green papaya salad originated in the communities of ethnic Chinese–Lao settlers living in what is now Central Thailand, who adopted the ancient Lao tradition of preparing salads from fruits, called tam som, to make salads from papayas. The new dish became known as som tam (the reversed order of tam som) during the early Rattanakosin period (late 18th to early 19th centuries) and, along with the papaya, then spread to today's Northeast Thailand following the construction of the Northeastern railway line during the turn of the 19th–20th centuries. The dish became more popular after the opening of Mittraphap Road in 1957, helping bring new papaya cultivars into the region, and has since become widely adopted by the ethnic Lao people of both Isan and Laos. Likewise, the hot flavour also spread to Isan and Laos from Central Thailand, which had been introduced to chilli peppers first.

However, chilli peppers, like papayas, were already fully integrated in the Lao territory by the time French explorer Henri Mouhot visited Laos, in 1861, and also in the Lao traditional culinary recipes. Furthermore, during the 1950s and 1960s, green papaya salad and other Lao dishes were rarely known in Bangkok and could only be found around the boxing stadium that gathered boxers and fans from Northeastern Thailand, as well as in mobile food carts outside construction sites with workers from Northeastern Thailand and gas stations serving long-distance bus drivers. During the standardization of the Thai national cuisine, green papaya salad was among the Northeastern or Lao dishes to be included into the Thai national cuisine and modified by reducing the amount of chilli peppers and increasing the amount of sugar.

Alternatively, some believe that som tam has evolved from a dish called "Pu Tam" mentioned in a recipe by gourmet chef Plien Passakornwong in her 1908 cookbook. This dish shares similarities with modern-day som tam but does not include papaya as an ingredient. The earliest known recipe for som tam in Thailand appeared in the Yaowapha cookbook series by Phra Chao Boromawong in 1935, which included "Som tam ton malakor" or "Khao man som tam". This recipe is similar to the som tam we know today and includes roasted peanuts and dried shrimp as key ingredients. It is often served with rice cooked in coconut milk.

Preparation

The dish combines the five main basic tastes: sourness of the lime, the spiciness of the chili, saltiness and savoriness of the fish sauce, and sweetness of palm sugar. The ingredients are mixed and pounded in a mortar, which is reflected in the Khmer, Lao and Thai names for the dish that literally mean "pounded papaya".

In Laos, green papaya salad is one of the traditional staples of the Lao. Pounded salads in Laos all fall under the parent category of tam som, which may or may not contain green papaya, however, when no specific type of tam som is mentioned, it is generally understood to refer to green papaya salad. For absolute clarity, however, the name tam maak hoong may be used, since this name means "pounded papaya".

In Thailand, it is customary that a customer ask the preparer to make the dish suited to his or her tastes.

Traditionally, the local variety of green papaya salad in the streets of Bangkok is very spicy due to the addition of a fistful of chopped hot bird's eye chili. However, with its rising popularity among tourists, it is now often served less spicy as it used to be in the past.

Additional ingredients

Together with the papaya, some or most of the following secondary items are added and pounded in the mortar with the pestle:
Asparagus beans
Brined "rice field crabs". These belong to the freshwater crab genera Sayamia, Chulathelphusa, and Esanthelphusa (previously classified as part of the genus Somanniathelphusa), which all belong to the Gecarcinucid crab subfamily Parathelphusinae. found in flooded rice fields and canals. Isan people eat the entire crab, including the shell.
Chili pepper
Dried shrimp
Fish sauce
Garlic
Monosodium glutamate
Hog plums
Lime slice and lime juice
Palm sugar
Shrimp paste
Fish paste
Raw Thai eggplant
Cherry or grape tomatoes (green or ripe)

Green papaya salad is often served with glutinous rice and kai yang/ping gai (grilled chicken). It can also be eaten with fresh rice noodles or simply as a snack by itself with, for instance, crispy pork rinds. The dish is often accompanied by raw green vegetables such as water spinach and white cabbage wedges on the side to mitigate the spiciness of the dish.

Variations

It is believed to have originated in Laos, from where it was exported into Cambodia, Thailand and Vietnam. Variations of the dish are found throughout Thailand, Cambodia, Vietnam and as well as in the West, where it is more commonly known by its Thai name.

A non-spicy green papaya salad version also exists in Laos, Vietnam and Thailand, which is much sweeter; it often contains crushed peanuts and is less likely to have fish paste or brined crab. Dried brine shrimp are used in this Central Thai version. There are also versions that make use of unripe mangoes, apples, cucumbers, carrots and other firm vegetables or unripe fruit. Besides using varieties of fruits or vegetables as the main ingredient a popular option is to use vermicelli rice noodles wherein the dish is known as tam sua.

Instead of papaya, other ingredients can be used as the main ingredient. Popular variations in Laos and Thailand include the salad with:
Cucumber, usually the small variety (tam maak taeng, tam taengkwa)
Green and unripe mango (tam maak muang, tam mamuang)
Green and unripe bananas (tam maak kuai, tam kluai)
Hard and unripe santol (tam krathon)
Banana flowers (tam hua pli)
Malay gooseberry (tam mayom)
Pomelo (tam som o)
Mu yo sausage (tam mu yo)
Mixed fruit (tam phonlamai ruam)
Coconut rice (khao man som tam)

Reception 
The Thai variation som tam has been listed at number 46 on World's 50 most delicious foods compiled by CNN Go in 2011 and 2018.

Gallery

See also

 List of fruit dishes
List of salads
Atchara

References

Further reading
 Cummings, Joe. (2000). World Food: Thailand. UK: Lonely Planet Publishers. pp. 157–8. 
 Williams, China ‘’et al.’’.. ‘’Southeast Asia on a Shoestring: Big Trips on Small Budgets.’’ Lonely Planet. p. 31. 
 Brissenden, Rosemary. (2007). Southeast Asian food: Classic and Modern Dishes from Indonesia, Malaysia, .. Tuttle Publishing. pp. 434 – 439. 
 McDermoot, Nancie. (1992). Real Thai: The Best of Thailand’s Regional Cooking. Chronicle Books. pp. 121 – 146. 

Salads
Vegetable dishes of Thailand
Burmese cuisine
Cambodian cuisine
Lao cuisine
Thai cuisine
Vegetable dishes
Fruit salads
National dishes
Papaya dishes